Diego Eli Moreira (born 4 September 1988) is a professional footballer who currently plays as a defensive midfielder for Hong Kong Premier League club Lee Man. Born in Brazil, he represents the Hong Kong national team.

Club career

After playing for a number of clubs in Brazil, Diego signed for Tuen Mun of Hong Kong First Division in 2012. In the following season, he signed with fellow Hong Kong First Division club Eastern on a free transfer.

On 1 June 2021, after staying at Eastern for 8 years, Diego signed for Lee Man.

International career
On 22 December 2019, after staying in Hong Kong for seven years, Diego confirmed that he had received his HKSAR passport, making him eligible to represent Hong Kong internationally.

On 17 May 2021, Diego received his first call-up alongside 2 teammates from Eastern to the Hong Kong national football team to play against Iran, Iraq and Bahrain for the 2022 World Cup qualifiers.

Career statistics

Club 
As of 22 May 2021

International

Honours
Eastern
Hong Kong Premier League: 2015–16
Hong Kong Senior Shield: 2014–15, 2015–16, 2019–20
Hong Kong FA Cup: 2013-14, 2019–20
Hong Kong Sapling Cup: 2020–21

References

External links

Diego Eli – Volante – Melhores Momentos
Eurosport profile
Diego Eli at HKFA
Eastern Sports Club profile 
Diego Eli – China 2013/2014

1988 births
Living people
Association football forwards
Hong Kong footballers
Hong Kong international footballers
Brazilian footballers
Brazilian emigrants to Hong Kong
Naturalized footballers of Hong Kong
Tuen Mun SA players
Eastern Sports Club footballers
Lee Man FC players
Hong Kong First Division League players
Hong Kong Premier League players
Brazilian expatriate sportspeople in Hong Kong
Brazilian expatriates in Hong Kong
Brazilian expatriate footballers